Coelops is a genus of bat in the family Hipposideridae. It contains the following species:
 East Asian tailless leaf-nosed bat (Coelops frithii)
 Malayan tailless leaf-nosed bat (Coelops robinsoni)

References

 
Bat genera
Taxa named by Edward Blyth
Taxonomy articles created by Polbot